Reese Klaiber is a Canadian country music artist. He lives in Alberta on a ranch. In 1998, Klaiber released his debut album, Where I Come From. His 1999 single "She's Sittin' Pretty" reached the Top 20 of the RPM Country Tracks chart.

Discography

Albums

Singles

References

Canadian country singers
Canadian male singers
Living people
Year of birth missing (living people)